Jennifer Lopez: All I Have was a concert residency by American entertainer Jennifer Lopez. Performed at Zappos Theater (formerly The AXIS Theater) located in the Planet Hollywood Resort & Casino in Las Vegas, Nevada, the residency began on January 20, 2016 and concluded on September 29, 2018. The show has received critical acclaim for its production and Lopez's showmanship. The residency grossed $101.9 million after 120 shows, making it the sixth highest-grossing Las Vegas residency of all time, and the top residency by a Latin artist.

Background and development 
It was first reported that Lopez had been offered a Las Vegas residency at Planet Hollywood in October 2014, in a deal which was said to be worth $350,000 per night. The residency was officially confirmed in May 2015. "The show is going to be a multifaceted, high-energy 'Jenny from the Block' party, mixing all aspects of what my fans and I love," Lopez stated. She announced on September 19, 2015, during her performance at the iHeartRadio Music Festival 2015 that her 2016 residency was named "All I Have" while a promotional poster was being displayed on the stage's backdrop.

Critical response 
Eve Barlow of The Guardian gave the show 5/5 stars and commended it as "two hours of high-octane entertainment", writing: "Tonight, Lopez promised to give us all she had. Via a catalogue spanning many genres, flavours and dance moves, she delivered a heck of a party. To borrow from her 2001 smash hit 'Play': that’s the hotness right there." Billboard rated the residency's opening night 4.5/5 stars, with Katie Atkinson stating, "It's not surprising that Lopez was tailor-made for Vegas." Writing for Time magazine, Nolan Feeney praised the show as "a spectacle as lively and extravagant as the city itself" while also noting, "the latest in a slew of pop stars to set up shop in Vegas, she brings a showmanship that’s hard to top". Feeney particularly favored the Latin music set, stating that it was "the most electrifying part" of the residency. Gerrick D. Kennedy of the Los Angeles Times dubbed Lopez "Queen of the Strip" and observed that "the production aims, and greatly succeeds, at setting a new gold standard for Vegas popstar showcases", while also commenting on Lopez's showmanship and sex appeal.

MTV News' Molly Lambert called the residency "a quintessentially Las Vegas show", writing: "This sort of robust entertainment is what we expect from Vegas: A glamorous star who can act, dance, and sing is really a nostalgic throwback — an old-fashioned kind of star-as-star — someone superior to mere human beings." Lambert added: "As for the singing? Well, a lot of it sounds live, although there are clearly backing tracks to help out." USA Today writer Jaleesa M. Jones described it as "a transcendent experience that harked back to the early 00's (when she was still rocking track suits and gelled-down baby hairs) while celebrating the best of the present (all bejeweled everything)." Mike Weatherford of the Las Vegas Review-Journal commented that "the showcase is far easier on the eyes than the ears. It’s more like a production show with a centerpiece." Rolling Stone writer Stephen L. Betts described Lopez's rendition of "I Hope You Dance" by country singer Lee Ann Womack as one of the show's highlights, calling it "emotional".

Commercial reception 
Tickets for the residency were available for sale to the public on May 16, 2015, through Ticketmaster for all dates with ticket prices ranging from US$59-$416. The concert which took place on August 13, 2016 earned over $1 million in revenue, becoming Planet Hollywood's highest-grossing show to date, breaking the previous box office record for a single show, previously set by Britney: Piece of Me. The record was once again broken by the final show of Britney: Piece of Me in December 2017. It was the most successful Las Vegas residency of 2016, grossing $34.6 million. By the 116th show on September 22, 2018, the residency had sold a total of 467,314 tickets, grossing $97.5 million. Celebrities who have attended the show include: Justin Bieber, Jeremy Bieber, Khloe Kardashian, Kim Kardashian, Jessica Alba, Becky G, Kerry Washington, Demi Lovato, Nick Jonas, Gloria Trevi, Drake, Selena Gomez, Sofia Vergara, Ellen DeGeneres, Smokey Robinson, Marc Anthony, Heidi Klum, Gwen Stefani, Laverne Cox, Kevin Hart, Pitbull, LL Cool J, Ne-Yo, Ja Rule, Drew Barrymore, Sarah Michelle Gellar and Dua Lipa.

Set list 
The following set list is representative of the show on January 20, 2016. It is not representative of all concerts for the duration of the show.

 "If You Had My Love"
 "Love Don't Cost a Thing"
 "Got a Lot of Livin' to Do"
 "Get Right"
 "I'm Real (Murder Remix)"
 "Feelin' So Good"
 "Jenny from the Block"
 "I'm Into You"
 "Girls"
 "Booty" 
 "Feel the Light"
 "I Hope You Dance"
 "Ain't It Funny (Murder Remix)"
 "Very Special" / "All I Have"
 "Hold It Don't Drop It"
 "Quimbara"/"Bemba Colora"
 "Quien Sera"
 "Let's Get Loud"
 "Tens"
 "Waiting for Tonight"
 "Dance Again"
 "On the Floor"

Notes
 On the opening night, January 20, 2016, Lopez was joined on stage by guest performers Ja Rule, Ne-Yo and Pitbull.

Shows

Cancelled shows

References

External links 
Official website

2016 concert residencies
2017 concert residencies
2018 concert residencies
Concert residencies in the Las Vegas Valley
Jennifer Lopez concerts
Zappos Theater